Ryan Ward (born November 13, 1989) is an American male acrobatic gymnast. With Kylie Boynton, he was awarded the bronze medal in the 2014 Acrobatic Gymnastics World Championships.

References 

1989 births
Living people
American acrobatic gymnasts
Male acrobatic gymnasts
Medalists at the Acrobatic Gymnastics World Championships
21st-century American people